The Cornell Art Museum at Old School Square is a museum in the Old School Square section of Delray Beach, Florida. It opened in 1990 in a former elementary school. Its seven exhibition galleries for national and international exhibitions of fine contemporary art and regional artists. The museum is named after Delray residents Harriet W. and George D. Cornell.

References

Museums in Palm Beach County, Florida
Art museums and galleries in Florida
Delray Beach, Florida
Art museums established in 1990
1990 establishments in Florida